Sant Andreu de Palomar is a neighbourhood of Barcelona. It's the oldest part of the Sant Andreu district. It was an independent old town with over 1,000 years of recorded history before being annexed to Barcelona on 20 April 1897.

It has an area of 174 hectares and has a population of about 55,000 inhabitants. Its boundaries are: the street Rovira i Virgili, old Riera de Horta, Passeig de Santa Coloma, the Meridiana Avenue and the railroad tracks.

Sant Andreu de Palomar
Sant Andreu de Palomar